Hung Hom is an area in the southeast of Kowloon Peninsula, Hong Kong. Including the area of Whampoa, Tai Wan, Hok Yuen, Lo Lung Hang and No. 12 Hill are administratively part of the Kowloon City District, with a portion west of Hung Hom Bay in the Yau Tsim Mong District. Hung Hom serves mainly residential purposes, but it is mixed with some industrial buildings in the north.

Geography
Hung Hom is in the southeast of the Kowloon Peninsula. It is bordered by Victoria Harbour in the south, King's Park in the west, No. 12 Hill, Hok Yuen and the valley Lo Lung Hang.
in the north.

History
Originally, Hung Hom was much smaller than the present-day context. Hung Hom Bay has been partially reclaimed several times since 1850, expanding the area of Hung Hom as a consequence. Rumsey Rock, formerly located in the bay, was buried in the reclamation process. Later a town was developed eastward parallel to the Hong Kong and Whampoa Dock.

Hung Hom was renamed to "Yamashita District" during the Japanese occupation from 1941 to 1945. It was one of the few places to be renamed.

Education

Holy Angels Canossian School
 Holy Carpenter Secondary School
 Hong Kong Community College (Hung Hom Bay campus)
 Hong Kong Polytechnic University
 Ma Tau Chung Government Primary School (Hung Hom Bay)

Hung Hom is in Primary One Admission (POA) School Net 35. Within the school net are multiple aided schools (operated independently but funded with government money) and Ma Tau Chung Government Primary School (Hung Hom Bay).

 Former schools
 Hung Hom Government Primary School - Later used as the Kowloon Junior School Hung Hom Campus, and the French International School of Hong Kong Hung Hom Campus.
 French International School of Hong Kong (Victor Segalen) Hung Hom Campus
 Kowloon Junior School (English Schools Foundation) Hung Hom Campus

Residential

 Chatham Gate
 Harbour Place 
 Harbourfront Horizon
 Harbourview Horizon
 The Harbourfront Landmark
 Hunghom Bay Centre
 Hunghom Gardens
 La Lumiere
 Laguna Verde
 The Metropolis Residence
 Royal Peninsula
 Stars by the Harbour
 Star Ruby
 The Vantage
 Whampoa Estate
 Whampoa Garden
 Public housing estates in Hung Hom

Facilities

 Hong Kong Coliseum
 Hung Hom Municipal Building, which includes the Hung Hom Library, Hung Hom Municipal Building Sports Centre, and the Hung Hom Market with a cooked food centre
 Hung Hom Fire Station
 Two post offices and the International Mail Centre
 Hutchison Park, a small park located in a built up residential area once occupied by docklands and fill-in to create more land for residential use.
 Tai Wan Shan Park, Tai Wan Shan Swimming Pool
 Hung Hum Promenade
 Hong Kong Police Traffic Kowloon West Base
 Fortune Metropolis, a shopping mall in Hung Hom Bay
 The Whampoa, a shopping centre in Whampoa Garden
 Lux Theatre
 Hotels, including Kerry Hotel Hong Kong, Harbour Grand Kowloon and Harbour Plaza Metropolis

Religion

 Kwun Yum Temple. Built in 1873. Grade II historic building
 Pak Tai Temple, located at No. 146 Ma Tau Wai Road. Built in 1876. Grade III historic building
 Holy Carpenter Church (Anglican)
 St. Mary's Church (Catholic)
 True World Lutheran Church

Transport

MTR
Hung Hom is served by the Hung Hom station of the MTR. The station serves both the East Rail line and Tuen Ma line. This station also previously played host to the Intercity Through Train (and the KTT) serving neighboring Guangdong province and other major cities in mainland China.

As of October 2016, Ho Man Tin station and Whampoa station as part of an extension of the Kwun Tong line, are available for accessing the Hung Hom area.

Tunnel

The Cross-Harbour Tunnel, part of Route 1, was the first road tunnel in Hong Kong that was built under water. It opened on 2 August 1972, and it connects Hong Kong Island and Kowloon at Kellett Island and a reclaimed site at Hung Hom Bay, respectively.

Ferries

Ferries serving Hung Hom Ferry Pier:
 New World First Ferry: North Point Ferry Pier - Hung Hom Ferry Pier (HK$6.5)
 Fortune Ferry: Central Ferry Pier - Hung Hom Ferry Pier (HK$9)

Buses
There are three bus terminals in Hung Hom. Many buses serve the area.
 Solely-operated cross harbour route: 108
 Cross harbour routes operated with Citybus: 102, 102P, 103, 107, 107P, 117, 118, 118P, 170, 171, 182, N118, N170, N182
 Cross harbour routes operated with New World First Bus: 101, 101R, 101X, 102R, 104, 106, 106A, 106P, 109, 110, 111, 111P, 112, 113, 115, 115P, 116, 301, N121, N122;
 Non-cross harbour routes: 2E, 3B, 5, 5A, 5C, 5D, 6C, 6F, 7B, 8, 8A, 8P, 11, 11K, 11X, 12A, 12P, 13X, 14, 15, 15X, 21, 26, 28, 30X, 41, 45, 85S, 85X, 87D, 93K, 98D, 219X, 224X, 230X, 260X, 268B, 269B, 271S, 287D, 296D, 297, 297P, N41X, N216, N241, N271, N281;
 New World First Bus: 796X.
 Citybus: A20, A21, A22, A23, E21X, E23, E23A, R11, R22, N11, N23, NA20.
 Minibus routes: 2, 2A, 6, 6A, 6X, 8, 13.

See also
 List of places in Hong Kong

References

External links

 Map of Hung Hom area